Francis M. "Bud" Mullen, Jr. (born 14 December 1934 in New London, Connecticut) is a former executive assistant director of the Federal Bureau of Investigation (FBI) and former Administrator of the Drug Enforcement Administration (DEA).

Biography 

Mullen began his life in New London, Connecticut, where after graduating from Central Connecticut State College (B.S. 1962) he served in the United States Air Force from 1953 to 1957. He became a police officer in New London, before being appointed as an FBI Special Agent in 1962.

Service with the DEA 1981-1985 

In July 1981, Mullen was designated Acting Administrator of the DEA. However, it was not until 21 January 1982 that President Ronald Reagan announced his intention to nominate Mullen as DEA Administrator, succeeding Peter Bensinger. Mullen served in an acting capacity from July 1981 until he was confirmed by the U.S. Senate on 30 September 1983 and sworn in as the DEA's third Administrator on 10 November 1983. He served until 1 March 1985.

After DEA 

After retiring from DEA on 1 March 1985, Mullen became the director of the Mohegan Tribal Gaming Commission in Uncasville, Connecticut at the Mohegan Sun Casino. He has since retired from that position.

References

External links
usdoj.gov - DEA History 1980 - 1985

1934 births
Living people
American municipal police officers
Drug Enforcement Administration Administrators
People from New London, Connecticut
Federal Bureau of Investigation agents
United States Air Force airmen